CVL may refer to:

 Cerebrovascular lesion, also called cerebrovascular accident or stroke
 Chattahoochee Valley Libraries
 Chinese Volleyball League, the pre-eminent men's and women's professional volleyball leagues in China from 1996 to 2017
 Cytovillin, a protein
 Light aircraft carrier
 The Center for Vital Longevity